Diversified Energy Company plc, formerly Diversified Gas & Oil plc, is a gas and oil production company operating in the Appalachian Basin in the United States. It is listed on the London Stock Exchange and is a constituent of the FTSE 250 Index.

The company owns over 69,000 oil and gas wells as of October 2021, making it the largest well owner in the United States.

History
The company was established by Robert ('Rusty') Hutson when he bought a gas well in West Virginia in 2001. The management then grew the business over the next decade by acquiring old gas and oil wells that the main producers did not want. It was the subject of a flotation on the Alternative Investment Market in February 2017 and moved to the premium market in May 2020. In September 2020 FTSE Russell announced that the company would be joining the FTSE 250 Index later in the month.

On 6 May 2021 the changed its name from Diversified Gas & Oil plc to Diversified Energy Company PLC and changed its TIDM code from DGOC to DEC.

in April 2022, it was announced that Diversified had acquired "certain East Texas upstream assets and related facilities" from a private seller for $50 million USD in cash.

Operations
Diversified primarily purchases end-of-life wells from major producers. These wells are inexpensive because state law requires non-producing wells be plugged, and the wells are priced with the expectation that they will have to be plugged in the near future. This is an expensive procedure, though Diversified reports that it can do so for under $25,000 per well, less than other producers. Diversified then claims to be able to operate these wells for as many as 50 more years, which greatly reduces the present value of the future plugging liability. Because of this reduction in liability, Diversified is able to claim the wells are worth more than it paid. Since 2014, Diversified has made more from these accounting gains than its cumulative reported profit.

In May 2020, the company owned 60,000 wells across the Appalachian Basin in the United States.

Environmental Impact
In 2018, the Pennsylvania Department of Environmental Protection found a subsidiary of Diversified to be out of compliance on over 1,000 abandoned wells.

In 2019 in Ohio, Diversified was found to have falsely claimed a well was producing natural gas, which meant the well was not required to be plugged. Diversified claimed it was an unintentional mistake. 

In April 2021, Diversified claimed in a report to investors that it had reduced greenhouse gas emissions 28% from 2019 to 2020, but reported to the Environmental Protection Agency that it had actually increased emissions 19% during the same time period.

An October 2021 investigation by Bloomberg News found that 59% of sampled natural gas wells belonging to Diversified were leaking significant amounts of methane, a potent greenhouse gas. These wells were producing little to no natural gas, and some of them appeared to be abandoned. State laws require that non producing gas wells be plugged promptly, a costly procedure. The company's share price dropped 21% in one day following publication of the investigation.

References

External links
Official site

Companies established in 2001
Companies listed on the London Stock Exchange
Oil companies of the United States
Natural gas companies of the United States
Energy companies established in 2001
Non-renewable resource companies established in 2001
Companies based in Birmingham, Alabama